James Michael Constable (born 21 September 1971) is an English pop singer and dancer who was a member of the pop band 911.

Early life
Constable was born in the Liverpool Maternity Hospital (now Liverpool Women's Hospital) in Toxteth, Liverpool, Lancashire (now Merseyside), to parents Margaret and James "Jimmy" Matthews.

He is a fan of Liverpool F.C.

Career

1990s: The Hit Man and Her
Constable began his career in the early 1990s as a dancer on the late-night ITV dance music show The Hit Man and Her.

1995–2000: 911
Whilst on the show, Constable met Simon "Spike" Dawbarn and Jason Orange. Having seen how successful the latter went on to become with his band Take That, Constable and Dawbarn (who had become even more popular than the acts they were dancing for) decided to put their own band together, and 911 was born. Lee Brennan, who was a fan of both the boys and The Hit Man and Her, agreed to join Constable and Dawbarn and they became a trio.

911 spent several months building up a fanbase from scratch, performing gigs in schools and small public venues. After independently releasing two singles which both made the UK top 40, "Night to Remember" and "Love Sensation", 911 were signed up by Virgin Records after a major label bidding war.

911 were extremely successful, selling over 10 million singles and six million albums worldwide before splitting up in 2000. Constable was the one who announced the split live on Radio 1. In a 2005 interview with The Guardian, Constable: "I didn't have any time to get my head around it. I had a lump in my throat saying it, then we came out of Radio 1 and the other two guys went to the pub. I got in my car and took off and I never saw them for two years."

Post-split
After the band split, Constable turned to drink and drugs, admitting "I found myself in my old single bed with a bottle of Jack Daniel's and a bottle of pain killers and thought about ending it there and then. The only thing that stopped me was thinking about the devastation it would cause for my family."

2006 saw Constable return to the music industry by taking part in the MTV series Totally Boyband. The series followed ex-members of other boy bands forming into a new band. The new band was called Upper Street, yet their first single was a commercial failure, charting at number 35 on the UK Singles Chart. The band quickly disbanded, with the whole project deemed a disaster. On 28 August 2007, he appeared on the BBC Two game show Identity, billed as an 'ex boyband member'.

2012–present: The Big Reunion and 911 comeback
On 18 October 2012, it was announced that 911, along with B*Witched, Five, Atomic Kitten, Honeyz and Liberty X, would be reuniting again for the ITV2 documentary series The Big Reunion.

Personal life
Jimmy was previously in a nine-year relationship with his girlfriend Bernadette Robertson, whom he met in 1985. He proposed to her in 1988 and four years later she gave birth to their son, Scott. In 1994, Jimmy left Bernadette in order to move to Glasgow, Scotland and focus on his music career with 911, although he did agree to give her away at her next wedding. Jimmy currently lives in Cambridgeshire with his wife Claire (whom he married in 2009) and two other children, Taylor and Ellie, whilst Scott lives with Bernadette in Runcorn. On 7 June 2013, he appeared on The Jeremy Kyle Show to talk about the issues that almost destroyed his life.

Filmography

References

1971 births
911 (English group) members
English male dancers
English male singers
Living people
Musicians from Liverpool
Upper Street (group) members